The Journey: The Very Best of Donna Summer is a compilation album by American singer Donna Summer released by Universal Music on September 30, 2003. It features most of Summer's best known songs from the 1970s disco era, during which she became the most successful female of that genre, plus some of her hits from the 1980s, during which time she experimented with different genres.

The Journey was released in the UK on the back of her appearance on the TV special Disco Mania which celebrated the 1970s disco era and saw Summer performing her 1979 duet "No More Tears (Enough Is Enough)" (originally with Barbra Streisand) with Irish boy band Westlife.

The album was also released in the US with a slightly different track listing—both on the album itself and also on the 'limited edition bonus disc'.

Three new songs were recorded for the collection, including "You're So Beautiful" and "Dream-A-Lot's Theme (I Will Live for Love)", both of which were released as promotional singles. The UK version of the compilation placed the two new recordings "That's the Way" and "Dream-A-Lot's Theme" on the limited edition bonus disc—these two tracks are consequently not available on the UK single-disc edition of The Journey.

Track listings

Charts and certifications

Weekly charts

Certifications

References

Albums produced by Richard Perry
Albums produced by Pete Bellotte
Albums produced by Giorgio Moroder
Albums produced by Michael Omartian
2003 greatest hits albums
Donna Summer compilation albums